Murad Ibrahim (born 11 June 1987) is a Bulgarian footballer who plays as a defender for Rodopa Smolyan.

References

External links

1987 births
Living people
Bulgarian footballers
Association football defenders
FC Spartak Plovdiv players
FC Montana players
FC Lyubimets players
PFC Pirin Gotse Delchev players
FC Oborishte players
FC Bansko players
FC Hebar Pazardzhik players
FC Sozopol players
First Professional Football League (Bulgaria) players
Second Professional Football League (Bulgaria) players
Bulgarian people of Turkish descent